The Heron House easement is an approximately 50-acre natural area protected by the Jefferson Land Trust on the Quilcene bay, including floodplain and tidelands, an estimated 1,300 ft of salt water frontage. It is located on the coast of Jefferson County, Washington in north-west Washington state on the Olympic Peninsula.  The conservation area was acquired in 2010.

See also
Hood Canal
Quilcene, Washington
Big Quilcene Estuary
Big Quilcene River
Little Quilcene Estuary
Little Quilcene River
Donovan Creek Estuary
Olympic Peninsula

References

External links
Heron House Jefferson Land Trust

Protected areas of Jefferson County, Washington
Nature reserves in Washington (state)
Protected areas established in 2010
2010 establishments in Washington (state)